The Steerswoman is a 1989 science fantasy novel by American writer Rosemary Kirstein.  It follows the journey of Rowan, who is a Steerswoman in an age that is just beginning to gain technology and advancement.  A Steerswoman or Steersman is a traveling scholar looking to supplement as well as share their knowledge.  They are required to answer any question put to them by anyone and in turn, any question they ask must be answered truthfully, or the questioner will be placed under a ban where no Steerswoman will ever answer a question from them again.  

The novel was originally published on August 13, 1989 by Del Rey.  It is the first book in the Steerswoman series.  In July 2003, the novel was combined with the second novel in the series, The Outskirter’s Secret and reprinted as The Steerswoman’s Road.

Plot summary
Steerswoman Rowan is investigating the origins of a number of beautiful blue crystals that have been found in random locations throughout the land. During her investigation, she meets Bel, an outspoken Outskirter (those who live on the outskirts of civilization). Rowan is later attacked on the road and Bel comes to her rescue. The two women agree to travel together. Bel agrees to not use any knowledge she gleans from Rowan’s help to allow her tribe to attack the outlying villages, which Outskirters do on occasion when their goats cannot sustain them.

The pair make their way back to The Archives, the central repository of knowledge of Steerswomen. Rowan's fellow Steerswomen agree that she should continue her investigation, but in a different manner than before, as her current investigations are drawing notice and attempts on her life, and they suggest she go undercover.  

The story switches perspective to a young runaway named Will, who has a talent for making things explode, much in the way wizards do sometimes.  He joins a caravan headed away from his home. Two of his traveling companions are Rowan and Bel, traveling in disguise. Will becomes attached to Bel and although the pair try to get rid of him as they leave the caravan to continue their investigation, he follows along to help out.

Bel and Rowan come to the town they intend to investigate as a rumored source of the stones and find a shopkeeper who claims to design and sell the stones himself.  With Will’s help, the pair discover this to be a false trail left for them, and quickly leave town, pretending to believe the story.  They are stalked by a group of soldiers who have orders to capture them and bring them to a pair of wizards, Dhree and Shammer, a brother and sister who Rowan eventually learns are under the control of a wizard named Slado.  She and Bel slip into the stronghold of the wizards disguised as guards and then Rowan is captured.

Rowan is surprised to discover that Dhree and Shammer are barely teenagers, and probably too young to actually be in control.  She is able to converse with them by giving them information freely and not asking them any questions that they would refuse to answer, thereby earning them the ban.  The siblings talk amongst themselves in her presence and she gleans valuable information from them for a time before they shut her up in a room to wait for Slado to arrive and take her.  Bel and Will spring her from her prison through the distraction of Will’s exploding magic.

Back at the Archives, the Steerswomen put together the clues they have gathered and conclude that the blue stones are pieces of a fallen guidestar, brought down for some unknown reason by the wizards, who may have put them up there in the first place.  Rowan plays the same information game she did with Dhree and Shammer with another wizard who is not loyal to Slado.  She convinces him to take Will on as an apprentice.  Will promises to share information about wizard magic with the Steerswomen.

Reception

Jo Walton has called the Steerswoman "terrific fun to read", with "really good prose", while James Nicoll stated that it was "what SF should aspire to be". Pornokitsch has described The Steerswoman as "a lovely example of an epic story driven by brains over brawn, and wit over magical destiny", noting that "unlike many of its contemporaries, [it] has not aged badly".

References

External links
Author’s Website

1989 American novels
American fantasy novels
1989 science fiction novels
Science fantasy novels
Del Rey books
1989 debut novels